Willey is a civil parish in Herefordshire, on the Welsh-English borders. The main source of employment is farming and there were a total of 61 residents in the parish at the 2001 census.  The parish borders on Stapleton, Lingen and Presteigne.

References

Civil parishes in Herefordshire